Gersi Diamanti (born 15 October 1999) is an Albanian footballer who plays as a forward for Egnatia in the Kategoria Superiore.

Career

Flamurtari
Diamanti made his league debut for the club on 17 March 2019, coming on as a 66th-minute substitute for Xhevahir Sukaj in a 0-0 draw with Laçi. Diamanti broke into the first team following the club's relegation to the Kategoria e Parë in 2020, making 19 first-team appearances and scoring eight goals. Diamanti returned to the team after they were relegated to the Kategoria e Dytë the following season, helping the team to promotion. He began the summer before the 2022–23 season with the team, but would transfer before the start of the campaign.

Egnatia
In August 2022, Diamanti joined Kategoria Superiore club Egnatia on a three-year deal.

Career statistics

Club

References

External links

1999 births
Living people
Flamurtari Vlorë players
Kategoria Superiore players
Kategoria e Parë players
Kategoria e Dytë players
Association football forwards
Footballers from Vlorë
Albanian footballers